Forget About It is a studio album by Alison Krauss, released in 1999. It reached number 5 on the Billboard Country Albums chart. The lead single, "Forget About It", peaked at number 67 on the Country Singles Chart, and "Stay" reached number 28 on the Adult Contemporary chart.

Critical reception
Country Standard Time wrote that "despite the prominence of dobro and mandolin here, it's obvious that Krauss is a pop star more than anything else."

Track listing
 "Stay" (Larry Byrom, Allyson Taylor) – 3:25
 "Forget About It" (Robert Lee Castleman) – 3:30
 "It Wouldn't Have Made Any Difference" (Todd Rundgren)– 4:28
 "Maybe" (Gordon Kennedy, Phil Madeira) – 3:47
 "Empty Hearts" (Michael McDonald, Michael Johnson) – 3:24
 "Never Got Off the Ground" (Danny O'Keefe) – 3:40
 "Ghost in This House" (Hugh Prestwood) – 4:04
 "It Don't Matter Now" (Michael McDonald) – 2:50
 "That Kind of Love" (Pat Bergeson, Michael McDonald) – 3:43
 "Could You Lie" (Ron Block) – 2:54
 "Dreaming My Dreams With You" (Allen Reynolds) – 4:28 (featuring Dolly Parton and Lyle Lovett)

Personnel
Alison Krauss – fiddle, vocals, harmony vocals
Viktor Krauss – bass
Barry Bales – bass, harmony vocals
Jim Keltner – drums
Kenny Malone – drums
Pat Bergeson – guitar
Ron Block – guitar, harmony vocals
Sam Bush – mandolin, slide mandolin, harmony vocals
Lyle Lovett – harmony vocals on "Dreaming My Dreams With You"
Evelyn Cox – harmony vocals
Sidney Cox – harmony vocals
Suzanne Cox – harmony vocals
Dolly Parton – harmony vocals on "Dreaming My Dreams With You"
Jerry Douglas – Dobro, lap steel guitar
Joey Miskulin – accordion
Matt Rollings – piano
Dan Tyminski – guitar, harmony vocals
Production notes:
Gary Paczosa – engineer, mixing
Doug Sax – mastering
Sandy Jenkins – engineer, assistant engineer
Thomas "Snake" Johnson – engineer, assistant engineer
Tim Waters – assistant engineer
Chuck Turner – digital editing
Tracy Martinson – digital editing
Matthew Barnes – photography
Nancy Given – art direction, design

Chart performance

Weekly charts

Year-end charts

References

1999 albums
Alison Krauss & Union Station albums
Rounder Records albums